Neltumius is a genus of pea and bean weevils in the beetle family Chrysomelidae. There are at least three described species in Neltumius.

Species
These three species belong to the genus Neltumius:
 Neltumius arizonensis (Schaeffer, 1904)
 Neltumius gibbithorax (Schaeffer, 1904)
 Neltumius texanus (Schaeffer, 1904)

References

Further reading

 
 
 

Bruchinae
Articles created by Qbugbot
Chrysomelidae genera